Apataniidae is a family of early smoky wing sedges in the order Trichoptera. There are about 18 genera and at least 180 described species in Apataniidae.

The type genus for Apataniidae is Apatania F. Kolenati, 1848.

Genera

References

Further reading

 
 
 
 
 
 
 
 

Trichoptera families
Integripalpia